Eugenia Garraffo (born 29 July 1993) is an Italian field hockey player for the Italian national team. She is daughter of former Argentinian hockey player Marcelo Garraffo.

She participated at the 2018 Women's Hockey World Cup.

References

1993 births
Living people
Italian female field hockey players
Female field hockey forwards
Expatriate field hockey players
Italian expatriate sportspeople in Argentina